De Beaumont may refer to:
 House of Beaumont, a Norman family
 de Beaumont Foundation, a US charitable foundation
 Charles de Beaumont (1902-1972), British Olympic fencer